The 2015 Granatkin Memorial is its 15th edition after dissolution of the USSR. Japan under-18 is its defending champion.

Groups

Group A

Group B

Group C

Group D

Group E

Group F

Group G Places 1-6

Group H Places 1-6

Group I Places 7-12

Group J Places 7-12

Group K Places 13-18

Group K Places 13-18

Match for 17th place

Match for 15th place

Match for 13th place

Match for 11th place

Match for 9th place

Match for 7th place

Match for 5th place

Match for 3rd place

Final

External links
 
 Мемориал Гранаткина. ISBN] 978-5-5095-5595-4

Valentin Granatkin Memorial
2015 in association football
2014–15 in Russian football